François Messier-Rheault is a Canadian cinematographer. He is most noted for his work on Denis Côté's 2017 film A Skin So Soft (Ta peau si lisse), for which he won the Prix Iris for Best Cinematography in a Documentary at the 20th Quebec Cinema Awards in 2018.

He was also a nominee in the same category at the 22nd Quebec Cinema Awards in 2020 for Dark Suns (Soleils noirs), and for Best Cinematography at the 21st Quebec Cinema Awards in 2019 for Ghost Town Anthology (Repertoire des villes disparues).

His other credits have included the films Land of Men (Terre des hommes), Little Brother (Petit frère), The Sound of Trees (Le Bruit des arbres), Wilcox, Heart Bomb (Une bombe au cœur), Social Hygiene (Hygiène social) and That Kind of Summer (Un été comme ça).

References

External links

Canadian cinematographers
French Quebecers
Living people
Year of birth missing (living people)